Sopotnica (Cyrillic: Сопотница) is a village in the municipalities of Novo Goražde, Republika Srpska and Goražde, Bosnia and Herzegovina.

Demographics 
According to the 2013 census, its population was 505, with 488 of them living in the Novo Goražde part and 17 in the Goražde part.

References

Populated places in Novo Goražde
Populated places in Goražde